Aplastoceros is a genus of moths belonging to the subfamily Tortricinae of the family Tortricidae.

Species 
Aplastoceros affabilis Diakonoff, 1956
Aplastoceros carphalea Diakonoff, 1953
Aplastoceros dentifera Diakonoff, 1953
Aplastoceros euetrias Diakonoff, 1953
Aplastoceros peneploca Diakonoff, 1953
Aplastoceros plumbata Diakonoff, 1953

See also 
List of Tortricidae genera

References

External links
Tortricid.net

Tortricidae genera
Epitymbiini